Michigan Park or Park Michigan or variant may refer to:
 Michigan Park, Washington, D.C.
 List of Michigan state parks

See also
 North Michigan Park, Washington, D.C.
 Park Township, Michigan (disambiguation)